Georg Indrevik (born 18 August 1939) is a Norwegian politician for the Progress Party.

He served as a deputy representative to the Norwegian Parliament from Hordaland during the terms 2001–2005 and 2005–2009.

On the local level, he was the deputy mayor of Fjell. Due to the death of mayor Lars Lie on 9 June 2010, Indrevik continues as mayor of Fjell.

References

1939 births
Living people
Deputy members of the Storting
Progress Party (Norway) politicians
Hordaland politicians
People from Fjell